Chono Penchev (born 11 December 1994) is a Bulgarian volleyball player, a member of Italian club Azimut Modena.

Personal life
Penchev was born in Plovdiv. He has two older brothers, Chavdar (born 1987), Nikolay (born 1992) and identical twin brother Rozalin, all of them are professional volleyball players.

Career
In 2016 he was loaned by PGE Skra Bełchatów to Greek club Iraklis Thessaloniki. On November 21, 2017 he was loaned once again, this time to Italian club Azimut Modena.

References

1994 births
Living people
Sportspeople from Plovdiv
Bulgarian men's volleyball players
Expatriate volleyball players in Greece
Expatriate volleyball players in Italy